Silberhorn (Māori: Rangirua) is the fifth highest peak in New Zealand, rising to . It is located in the Southern Alps on the south ridge of Mount Tasman (3,497 m). Its name, "silver horn" in German, was probably given by William Spotswood Green in 1882 after its resemblance to Silberhorn in the Swiss Alps. Its Māori name, Rangirua, literally translates to 'second sky' (rangi: sky; rua: two). The first ascent of Silberhorn was in 1895 by Edward FitzGerald and his guide Matthias Zurbriggen.

See also
 List of mountains of New Zealand by height

References

Southern Alps
Westland District
Mountains of the West Coast, New Zealand